Moby Media Group is the largest media company in Afghanistan. Moby Group is privately owned, with headquarters in Kabul and 15 bureaus throughout Afghanistan. The company also has an office in Dubai, where regional business is conducted.

History
Moby Group was founded by Afghan entrepreneur Saad Mohseni with the start-up help of United States government money and with a cash injection from News Corporation, led by his friend Rupert Murdoch. The company has partnered with Voice of America in Afghanistan, and the US government has continued funding some of its broadcasts.

Saad Mohseni is an Afghan-Australian who returned to his native Afghanistan in 2002. Saad is founder and current chief executive officer of Moby Group. Based in the capital city of Kabul, as of 2010 the company employs over 400 staff across 11 businesses.

In 2015, the Taliban labeled TOLO TV a 'propaganda network'.

In 2016, its subsidiary Lapis was paid AU$1.6 million for promoting a controversial "anti-refugee" film commissioned by the Australian Department of Immigration. The film was also broadcast on TOLO TV.
 
Moby Group has offices in Afghanistan, UAE, Pakistan, and Ethiopia.

Group structure
The company has three divisions:

 Moby Media Group, with the broadcast brands TOLOnews, TOLO TV, Lemar TV, Arman FM and Tolo Music (Web), along with production, media distribution, talent management, print media and directories.
 Moby Technology Group, which operates technology companies Afghan ITT and 456 in the IT&T and Interactive voice response arenas.
 Moby People Group, which  includes the advertising agency Lapis and the AndeshaGah Internet café chain.

See also
Internet in Afghanistan
Communications in Afghanistan

References

External links
 Moby Media Group

Mass media companies of Afghanistan
Mass media companies established in 2002
2002 establishments in Afghanistan